Champ for a Day is a 1953 American crime film directed by William A. Seiter and written by Irving Shulman. The film stars Alex Nicol, Audrey Totter, Charles Winninger, Hope Emerson, Joseph Wiseman and Barry Kelley. The film was released on August 15, 1953, by Republic Pictures.

Plot
Big pug George Wilson shows up at a motel and diner run by Ma and Pa Karlsen, saying he's supposed to meet his manager, Dolan. He catches the eye of another customer, the attractive Miss Gormley, but she seems to be in a bad mood.

George has a fight lined up, but boxing promoters Guido and Healy believe that Dolan has run off with George's advance payment. George decides to go ahead with the fight, with down-and-out trainer Al Muntz agreeing to work in his corner.

By winning the fight, George angers ex-boxer Willie Foltis, who had bet heavily on the loser. George stays with the Karlsens and becomes better acquainted with Miss Gormley, who, it turns out, had also come there to meet Dolan, who was trying to blackmail her into marriage.

A bout with the tough "Soldier" Freeman is set up, but Guido and Healy insist that George throw the fight. Muntz warns him that Guido and Healy are connected with organized crime. Willie also comes to rob George of his prize winnings from the previous fight, but George knocks him cold.

Dolan's dead body is found in the river. George schemes to turn Guido and Healy against one another, resulting in them exchanging gunfire after the fight. Miss Gormley likes the way George has handled himself and they look like a perfect match.

Cast      
Alex Nicol as George Wilson
Audrey Totter as Miss Peggy Gormley
Charles Winninger as Pa Karlsen
Hope Emerson as Ma Karlsen
Joseph Wiseman as Dominic Guido
Barry Kelley as Tom Healy
Harry Morgan as Al Muntz 
Jesse White as Willie Foltis
Horace McMahon as Sam Benton
Grant Withers as Scotty Cameron
Eddy Waller as Phil
Dick Wessel as 'Speedtrap' Calhoun 
Hal Baylor as 'Soldier' Freeman

References

External links
 

1953 films
1950s English-language films
American crime drama films
1953 crime drama films
Republic Pictures films
Films directed by William A. Seiter
American black-and-white films
1950s American films